Minnetonka High School, or MHS (locally referred to as Tonka), is a four-year public high school located in Minnetonka, Minnesota, United States, a western suburb of Minneapolis-St. Paul. The school enrolls about 3,540 students, and offers four interchangeable academic curricula: International Baccalaureate, Advanced Placement, Honors, and G (general). Newsweek ranked the school at #123 in their list of America's Top High Schools. Minnetonka High School is currently rated #4 in public high schools in Minnesota by Niche.

Minnetonka High School is the only high school within Minnetonka School District, whose enrollment area comprises western Minnetonka, northern Chanhassen, Deephaven, Excelsior, Greenwood, Shorewood, Tonka Bay, Woodland, northern Victoria, and northern Eden Prairie; an area known as "South Lake Minnetonka," or simply "Minnetonka." Additionally, students come from all over the western suburbs due to open enrollment.

Demographics
Minnetonka High School has the second largest enrollment of any high school in Minnesota, behind neighboring Lake Conference rival Wayzata High School. , it has a student population of 3,444 that is 0.5% Native American 4.8% Hispanic, 3.7% black, 6.5% Asian, and 80.2% white. Minnetonka School District's catchment area has a population of 53,000 and is characterized as a bedroom community. It is predominantly white with a strong Scandinavian influence, and is considered one of the most affluent areas in the state. Since the 2000s, Minnetonka has actively tried to recruit a more diverse student body through advertising and participation in The Choice Is Yours program to serve inner regions of the Twin Cities metropolitan area.

Academics

Minnetonka High School has been shown to fare well in standardized test results and many metrics of school rank and quality. It is one of the few schools in the state to concurrently run Advanced Placement classes and the IB Diploma Programme. The school also offers Honors and G (general) classes which, unlike AP and IB, do not have curricula mediated by an external governing entity, and are meant to be less demanding.

It is identified as a "National School of Excellence" by the U.S. Department of Education, and has been given a "Five Star" rating by the Minnesota Department of Education. According to No Child Left Behind Minnetonka High School made Adequate Yearly Progress .

Specialty programs

VANTAGE
VANTAGE Professional Studies is a program offered by Minnetonka High School offering a businesslike environment for students.  Minnetonka High School's VANTAGE is a magnet program which is ranked sixth in the country for developing students with strong business and entrepreneurial leadership skills. Students go off campus for part of their school day and have class in an office building.  Students are expected to act and dress professionally.  Students are provided with projects with local and fortune 500 companies.  They are also provided with mentors who work in a field related to their class.  Currently (2022–23) there are nine course "strands" that are being offered: 
 Global Business
 Business Analytics
 Design and Marketing
 Digital Journalism
 Health Sciences
 Public Policy 
 Global Sustainability
 User Experience (UX) Design
 Vantage Education

Tonka Online
Minnetonka High School also offers some of its courses through Tonka Online.  It is available to all students in the state of Minnesota.  Currently (2016–17), There are 28 courses offered.  The classes are delivered through Schoology, Minnetonka's CMS.  Fees are charged for students who are taking them as extra courses or over the summer.

Minnetonka Research
Minnetonka Research offers students the opportunity to learn through scientific research. The school built a "cutting-edge", negative-pressure, wet lab to allow students to research topics that are important to them.  Alike VANTAGE, Minnetonka Research provides its students with mentors who are industry leaders in their field of study. In addition to this, many of the students in Minnetonka research compete in the Minnesota State Science and Engineering Fair,  and many of go on to compete in the International Science and Engineering Fair(ISEF).

MOMENTUM
MOMENTUM, a state-of-the-art Technology Education program, is Minnetonka High School’s newest specialty program.  It allows students to explore careers with hands on training in Construction Systems, Manufacturing, Design, and Transportation.  The program began during the 2020-21 school year, providing a trade school experience without leaving the campus.  MOMENTUM also partners with local businesses, to teach about their fields.

Writing Center
Minnetonka also offers a writing center to allow all students a place to receive assistance on their work.  It is located in the commons. The writing center is staffed by two English teachers and 30 trained student writing coaches.  The program is funded by the Minnetonka Public Schools Foundation's Endowment.

Athletics

Minnetonka High School is part of the Lake Conference in the Minnesota State High School League.  The school mascot is a Skipper.

Notable alumni

 Nancy Parsons (1960), actress
 Keith Nord (1975), former American football defensive back in the National Football League
Lee Blessing (1967), Pulitzer and Tony nominated playwright
Steve Comer (1972), former MLB Pitcher
Eric Bischoff (1973), American entrepreneur, television producer, professional wrestling booker, podcast host, and on-screen personality
Thomas O. Staggs (1978), former Chief Operating Officer, The Walt Disney Company
David Wheaton (1988), former professional tennis player
Peter A. Selfridge (1989), U.S. public servant who served as the United States Chief of Protocol from 2014 to 2017
Arick Wierson (1990), Emmy-award-winning Hollywood Film and Television Producer
Jim Brower (1991), former MLB Pitcher
Dmitry Chaplin (2000), Russian dancer and Emmy nominated choreographer
Will Leer (2003), American mid-distance runner
Jake Gardiner (2008), American professional ice hockey defenseman
Beau Allen (2010), NFL nose tackle for the New England Patriots 
Haley Kalil (2010), Sport Illustrated swimsuit model
Ryan McCartan (2011), American actor and singer
John Mark Nelson (2012), American songwriter and producer
Vinni Lettieri, professional ice hockey player for the New York Rangers organization
Justin Holl, professional ice hockey player
K'Andre Miller, ice hockey player
Terry Katzman, producer, sound engineer, archivist, and record-store owner

Feeder schools

 Elementary School
 Clear Springs Elementary
 Deephaven Elementary School
 Excelsior Elementary School
 Groveland Elementary
 Minnewashta Elementary School
 Scenic Heights Elementary
 Middle School
 Minnetonka Middle School East 
 Minnetonka Middle School West

References

External links

Official Minnetonka Football Website
Minnetonka High School iPads

Public high schools in Minnesota
Schools in Hennepin County, Minnesota
Chanhassen, Minnesota
Minnetonka, Minnesota
International Baccalaureate schools in Minnesota
Educational institutions established in 1952
1952 establishments in Minnesota